Malija is a village in the Municipality of Izola in the Slovenian Istria region of Slovenia.

Church

The local church is dedicated to Our Lady of Mount Carmel and was built in 1932.

References

External links
Malija on Geopedia

Populated places in the Municipality of Izola